John Harman Broadstock (1 December 1920 – 26 September 1995) was an Australian rules footballer who started his league career with West Adelaide Football Club in the South Australian National Football League (SANFL) in 1938 before moving to Melbourne to play for the Richmond Football Club in the Victorian Football League (VFL) in 1943 and winning a premiership with the club in his debut season. He served as a private in the Australian Army during the Second World War.

Career
In just his sixth VFL game, Broadstock became a premiership player when he was the centreman in Richmond's winning 1943 VFL Grand Final team. He played finals football again the following season and kicked three goals in a Semi Final loss to Fitzroy, but was suspended for eight weeks for hacking.

Broadstock had started his career at West Adelaide in 1938 and returned there in 1947. He missed out on playing in their premiership side that year when he was suspended the week before for hacking at Port Adelaide ruckman Bob McLean.

He captain-coached Boulder City to a Goldfields National Football League premiership in 1948, having spent the first half of the season unavailable to play due to residential qualification requirements and a tribunal suspension that was imposed the previous season in Adelaide. Broadstock returned to West Torrens the following season and was a losing Grand Finalist. Back at West Adelaide in 1950, he was captain coach for the year before announcing his retirement.

References

Holmesby, Russell and Main, Jim (2007). The Encyclopedia of AFL Footballers. 7th ed. Melbourne: Bas Publishing.

External links

Tigerland Archive

1920 births
Richmond Football Club players
Richmond Football Club Premiership players
West Adelaide Football Club players
West Adelaide Football Club coaches
West Torrens Football Club players
Boulder City Football Club players
Australian rules footballers from South Australia
1995 deaths
Australian Army personnel of World War II
Australian Army soldiers
One-time VFL/AFL Premiership players